The 2006 Rhein Fire season was the 12th season for the franchise in the NFL Europe League (NFLEL). The team was led by head coach Jim Tomsula in his first year, and played its home games at LTU arena in Düsseldorf, Germany. They finished the regular season in third place with a record of six wins and four losses.

Offseason

Free agent draft

Personnel

Staff

Roster

Schedule

Standings

Game summaries

Week 1: vs Frankfurt Galaxy

Week 2: at Berlin Thunder

Week 3: at Cologne Centurions

Week 4: vs Hamburg Sea Devils

Week 5: at Amsterdam Admirals

Week 6: vs Amsterdam Admirals

Week 7: vs Berlin Thunder

Week 8: at Frankfurt Galaxy

Week 9: at Hamburg Sea Devils

Week 10: vs Cologne Centurions

Honors
After the completion of the regular season, the All-NFL Europe League team was selected by the NFLEL coaching staffs, members of a media panel and fans voting online at NFLEurope.com. Overall, Rhein had four players selected. The selections were:

 Aaron Halterman, tight end
 Terrence Robinson, linebacker
 Derrick Strong, defensive end
 Ronyell Whitaker, cornerback

Notes

References

Rhein
Rhein Fire seasons
Rhein
Rhein